Radical 34 or radical go meaning "go" is one of the 31 Kangxi radicals (214 radicals total) composed of three strokes.

In the Kangxi Dictionary, there are 11 characters (out of 49,030) to be found under this radical.

Since there is no commonly used modern Traditional Chinese character under radical 34, this radical is omitted in some Traditional Chinese dictionaries. In addition, the most common graphic form of radical 66 (攴, rap; hit) when it appears on the right side of a compound character (攵) is also very similar graphically.  

No associated indexing component was left after the merger.

Evolution

Derived characters

Literature

External links

Unihan Database - U+5902

034
044